Isabel Dawes (born 11 May 2001) is an Australian rules footballer playing for Brisbane in the AFL Women's competition (AFLW). 

Raised in Maroochydore, Queensland Dawes competed in the boys competition due to a lack of opportunities for girls in local competition. She was signed to the Lions Academy at a young age.

Dawes made her debut in the Lions' round 1 game against  at Hickey Park on 8 February 2020.

References

External links
 

2001 births
Living people
Sportswomen from Queensland
Sportspeople from the Sunshine Coast
Australian rules footballers from Queensland
Brisbane Lions (AFLW) players
Lesbian sportswomen
LGBT players of Australian rules football
21st-century Australian LGBT people